A Burglar's Mistake is a 1909 American silent short drama film directed by D. W. Griffith.

Cast
 Harry Solter as Henry Newman
 Charles Inslee as Dick Folsom
 Marion Leonard as Mrs. Newman
 Adele DeGarde as One of the Children
 Robert Harron as The Messenger
 Raymond Hatton as At Folsom's / Secretary (unconfirmed)
 Arthur V. Johnson as Policeman
 David Miles as At Folsom's
 Owen Moore as At Folsom's
 Herbert Prior as Policeman
 Gertrude Robinson as One of the Children
 Mack Sennett as At Folsom's / Policeman
 Dorothy West as One of the Children

Reception 
The film played alongside D. W. Griffith's 1909 film, Trying to Get Arrested at the Royal Theater in Bisbee, Arizona where it was praised in the local newspaper by the Royal's owner, who stated it was "one of the most intense drama's ever staged."

References

External links
 

1909 films
1909 drama films
1909 short films
Silent American drama films
American silent short films
American black-and-white films
Films directed by D. W. Griffith
1900s American films